Take Me Back to Chicago is a compilation album by Chicago released in 1985 by Columbia/CBS Special Products with Cat. N. PC 39579 and the first one to bear this title; in 1990 a different compilation was released by CBS/Columbia with the Cat. N. 21581 with the same title but a different track list. This 1985 release was issued by Columbia/CBS at a time when the band was enjoying many hit singles and swift album sales for Warner Brothers, and consists of hit singles and key album tracks that (save for the title track) had not appeared on the band's two Greatest Hits albums on the Columbia label, while the 1990 release features many tracks already present on the previous Greatest Hits.

Because Chicago had, by 1985, moved to their new label, Take Me Back to Chicago was not directly authorized by the band and they do not acknowledge it in their official discography. Also notable is the fact that the 1990 release featured almost exclusively songs by bassist and singer Peter Cetera, rather than a mix of material by all of the band's songwriters (the 1985 release has a more balanced sampling of material between each songwriter and the different time periods). By this time, the once prominent writers, Robert Lamm and James Pankow, who had composed nearly all of the material in the early days of the band, were losing ground due to the band's stylistic changes. Only two of Pankow's songs are featured on this compilation, and Lamm was credited only as a co-composer on one song.

The 1985 version album was issued on LP, cassette, and CD, while the 1990 version was released only on cassette (BT 21581) and CD (A 21581). The 1985 release was not a critical or sales success. A particularly harsh review came in one sentence from AllMusic, stating that it was "Another pointless rip-off compilation by Columbia Records, and this one doesn't even contain any big hits."

Track listing

1985 Edition
"Listen" (Robert Lamm)
"Free" (Lamm)
"Thunder and Lightning" (Peter Cetera, Lamm, Danny Seraphine)
"Lowdown" (Cetera, Seraphine)
"I'm a Man" (Steve Winwood, Jimmy Miller)
"Prelude (Little One)" (Seraphine, David Wolinski)
"Little One" (Seraphine, Wolinski)
"You Are on My Mind" (James Pankow)
"Take Me Back to Chicago" (Seraphine, Wolinski)
"Mongonucleosis" (Pankow)
"Harry Truman" (Lamm)

1990 Edition
All songs written by Cetera, except where noted.

"Baby, What a Big Surprise" - 3:05
"Happy Man" - 3:15
"Take Me Back to Chicago" (Seraphine, Wolinski) - 5:17
"If You Leave Me Now" - 3:54
"Old Days" (James Pankow) - 3:31
"Song for You" - 3:41
"Thunder and Lightning" (Cetera, Lamm, Seraphine) - 3:32
"Wishing You Were Here" - 4:34
"Mama Take" - 4:05
"Run Away" (Pankow) - 4:18

References

Chicago (band) compilation albums
1985 compilation albums
1990 compilation albums
Columbia Records compilation albums